Memshi (also Romanized as Memshī) is a village in Valupey Rural District, in the Central District of Savadkuh County, Mazandaran Province, Iran. At the 2006 census, its population was 86, in 23 families.

References 

Populated places in Savadkuh County